Colga of Kilcolgan, Irish saint, .

Colga was the founder of the first Christian settlement at Kilcolgan, County Galway. He would have been contemporary with 
Colman mac Duagh and Surney of Drumacoo. His sister, Feilis, also founded a Christian settlement in the area.

According to genealogies, Colga and Feilis were of the progeny of Aodh mac Lughaidh mac Nath Í. This would make him a kinsman of the Uí Fiachrach Aidhne dynasty, and its rulers such as Guaire Aidne mac Colmáin.

See also
 Colga FC

References

 The Great Book of Irish Genealogies, 711.12, pp. 718–19, volume two, Dubhaltach MacFhirbhisigh; edited, with translation and indices by Nollaig Ó Muraíle, 2003-2004. 

Christian clergy from County Galway
6th-century Irish priests